The , located about 800 metres south-east of the atomic bomb hypocentre in Nagasaki, is noted for its one-legged stone torii at the shrine entrance.

Torii

The well-known  was one of the unanticipated results of the atomic bomb blast on August 9, 1945.

The epicenter of the bomb's destructive force was located approximately 800 meters from the shrine (in the right background of the image on the left).

One support column was knocked down; but the other somehow remained standing, keeping the gate upright. The force of the shockwave rotated the torii about 30 degrees on its pedestal base. The central part of the shrine is located just behind the photographer of the image on the right.

Trees

The surviving trees of Sannō Shrine have become another living demonstration of destruction and re-growth.  Two large camphor trees were scorched, burned and stripped of all leaves by the bomb's shock wave; and yet, despite everything, the trees survived.  One tree in Nagasaki was designated a natural monument on February 15, 1969.

The dead parts of the living trees have been enveloped by new growth.

Shrine

Notes
 

Monuments and memorials in Japan
Shinto shrines in Nagasaki Prefecture
Buildings and structures in Nagasaki
Monuments and memorials concerning the atomic bombings of Hiroshima and Nagasaki
Chinjusha
Religious buildings and structures completed in 1638
Religious buildings and structures completed in 1869